The Delaware United States House election for 1790 was held on November 8, 1790.  The former Continental Congressman John Vining won reelection.

Results

References

Delaware
1790
1790 Delaware elections